Comani may refer to:
 , a village in Drăgănești-Olt, Romania
 Daniela Comani, Italian artist
 Comani language, an unclassified language of South America (possibly extinct or spurious)
 Comani (tribe), a Gallic tribe

See also 
 Cumani (disambiguation)
 Komani (disambiguation)
 Conami